Otjiwarongo railway station is a railway station serving the town of Otjiwarongo in Namibia. It is part of the TransNamib Railway.

Railway stations in Namibia
TransNamib Railway
Otjiwarongo
Buildings and structures in Otjozondjupa Region

References